Deadly Relations is a 1993 American television film directed by Bill Condon. It stars Robert Urich, Shelley Fabares and Gwyneth Paltrow. The film originally aired on ABC on May 22, 1993.

Deadly Relations is based on the true crime book Deadly Relations: A True Story of Murder in a Suburban Family by Carol Donahue and Shirley Hall. Donahue and Hall are the daughters of Leonard Fagot, a New Orleans attorney whose obsession with controlling his daughters led to him murdering their husbands for hefty insurance pay outs.

Plot
Leonard Fagot has four daughters with whom he is obsessed. He lets them know how he feels about the men they date. And if he disapproves of them, he probably will have them killed to get them out of his daughters' life.

Cast
 Robert Urich as Leonard J. Fagot
 Shelley Fabares as Shirley Fagot
 Gwyneth Paltrow as Carol Ann Fagot Applegarth Holland
 Joy Farmer as Shirley Fagot, Jr.
 Georgia Emelin as Joanne Fagot Westerfield
 Jillian Boyd as Nancy Fagot
 Matthew Perry as George Westerfield
 Tony Higgins as Mike Holland
 Ted Marcoux as Bruce Applegarth
 Roxana Zal as Marty

References

External links
 
 
 

1993 television films
1993 films
1990s crime drama films
American crime drama films
American thriller films
Thriller films based on actual events
Films based on non-fiction books
Films directed by Bill Condon
Films set in the 1960s
Films set in the 1970s
Films shot in Atlanta
Crime films based on actual events
ABC Motion Pictures films
American drama television films
1990s American films